Authentic Films is a film production company based in Cleveland. The company was founded and is owned by Kate O'Neil and Kevin Kerwin. O'Neil is the producer of Authentic Films and Kerwin, who has a master's degree in film from Columbia University, is the director. Authentic Films create the trailers for the Cleveland International Film Festival (CIFF).

Critical reception 
Authentic Films received praise from SHOOT for their 2008 campaign for the Akron Children's Hospital which focused on cancer patients who were being treated at the hospital. The 2008 ad campaign was called "moving," and a 2009 follow-up built on the success of the first series of ads for the hospital.

Filmography 
 Filmic Achievement (2005). 
 Running America (2010). 
 Live at the Agora (2015).

References

External links
Authentic Films
Filmic Achievement Official Website

Film production companies of the United States